The Last American Virgin is a 1982 American sex comedy film written and directed by Boaz Davidson. It is a remake of Davidson's 1978 Israeli film Eskimo Limon (Lemon Popsicle).

After the success of the original film and its sequels in Israel, Davidson re-teamed with producers Golan-Globus to attempt to recreate the same success in the United States. Though the film's plot and characters remained largely the same, the setting was updated from 1950s Israel to then-present day suburban Los Angeles. The soundtrack, a major facet of both films, was also updated from the original's golden oldies to more contemporary new wave rock.

Plot
The plot closely follows the original Israeli film Eskimo Limon (Lemon Popsicle), and revolves around protagonist Gary, a typical high school student and pizza delivery boy, and his friends Rick—the slick talking ladies' man—and David--obese and bumbling, but popular and confident.

Most of the plot involves their numerous attempts to have sex, which are usually successful for Rick and David, but never for Gary. Early in the film, the three boys pick up three girls with the promise of cocaine (instead they use Sweet'n Low). They go over to Gary's house where he gets stuck with the homely and overweight Millie, a friend of the other two more attractive girls. But their party is interrupted when Gary's parents return home and pandemonium ensues.

A love triangle develops between Gary, Rick, and Karen, a beautiful new virginal student who Rick is determined to have sex with. Gary first sees her one night at an ice cream parlor, then in the school lunchroom, and asks David to find out where she lives. The next morning, in an attempt to get closer to her, he punctures her bike tires and invites her to ride to school with him. During and after the ride, he makes multiple attempts to woo her, much to her indifference. That evening, Gary attends a party at David's house and is devastated to find Karen in close company with Rick. He tries to entice her away from his friend but she treats him with blank disinterest. He becomes drunk and makes a fool of himself, falling about, then creates an embarrassing scene in front of his parents' dinner guests when he goes home.  

One day Gary delivers pizza to Carmela, a glamorous Latina woman whose sailor boyfriend is never home, and she tells him she wants more than just pizza. Being too afraid to follow up on it, he goes away and convinces his friends to go along with him. She promptly copulates with Rick and David, but her boyfriend Paco returns home just as Gary is about to have his turn, prompting them to flee.

In order to keep Rick and Karen apart, Gary and David persuade Rick to join them in patronizing a tart-tongued streetwalker known to work a busy highway corner in the neighborhood. Gary's encounter with her is awkward and unpleasant, causing him to vomit.  The next day at school, all three boys realize they've contracted crab lice from the prostitute, and after trying unsuccessfully to drown them in a public swimming pool, they have to bring their problem to an amused middle-aged pharmacist.  

Eventually, after Karen and Rick have sex, she becomes pregnant, and he callously dumps her.  Enraged Gary confronts Rick in the school library and a physical fight occurs, with Rick calling Gary jealous and Gary denouncing Rick as a lowlife.  Gary decides to help Karen pay for an abortion by selling most of his possessions and borrowing money from his boss. After the abortion, Gary and Karen spend the remainder of the weekend alone together in Gary's grandmother's house. While nursing her back to health, Gary tells Karen that he sincerely loves her. Karen appears to reciprocate and they both share a tender kiss. Karen invites Gary to her 18th birthday party the following week. Gary scrapes up a few more dollars and buys Karen a gold locket for her birthday.

When Gary arrives at the party, his dreams of a lasting romance with Karen are shattered when he walks in on her making out with Rick again. Despite what Rick had put Karen through, and despite Gary's devotion and support, she's rejected Gary to reunite with the slick-talking ladies' man. Gary sadly leaves the party without saying a word to either of them, taking Karen's gift with him. Tears streaming down his face, Gary drives home alone, emotionally broken and defeated.

Cast

Home media

VHS, CED Videodisc
The film was released on VHS and CED Videodisc by Cannon Films, November 30, 1983.

LaserDisc
The film was released by Guild Home Video on LaserDisc with a digital stereo soundtrack in 1984.

DVD, Blu-ray
The Region 1 DVD was first released in 2002 by MGM Home Entertainment. The only audio option is a 2.0 stereo mix in either English or French. The film was released on Blu-ray in 2015 by Olive Films.

Soundtrack

Additional songs in the film include:

 "In the Flesh" - Blondie
 "Oh No" - The Commodores
 "Open Arms" - Journey
 "Keep on Loving You" - REO Speedwagon
 "Just Once" - Quincy Jones feat. James Ingram
 "That's the Way (I Like It)" - KC and the Sunshine Band
 "Love Action (I Believe in Love)" - The Human League
 "Shake It Up" - The Cars
 "Besame Mucho & Granada"- Los Fabulosos 3 Paraguayos
 "It Aint Easy Comin' Down" - Charlene
 "Zero Hour" - The Plimsouls
 "España Cani" - The Dancing Brass

The 1982 Japanese release of the soundtrack (Polydor 28MM 0206) replaced the Tommy Tutone track with The Human League's recording of "Love Action (I Believe in Love)". While "Just Once", which featured prominently over the final scene, was not included on the soundtrack album, Ingram was nominated for Best Male Pop Vocal Performance at the 1982 Grammy Awards.

On all DVD and Blu-ray releases, at request of the band themselves, Love Action has been omitted and replaced with a repeated use of Whip It by Devo in one scene. The original MGM VHS tape has the original song intact though.

Reception
Responding to criticism dismissing The Last American Virgin as distasteful, critic Noel Murray of The A.V. Club commented "Really, the film's frankness makes it more honest than its dreamy-eyed descendants; even the shallow treatment of girls captures the point of view of a luckless teenage boy."

In an essay written a quarter-century later, critic Andy Selsberg noted that, unlike the other teen sex comedies of the 1980s, The Last American Virgin was the only one truthful enough to have a "main character... left longing for his dream girl", whereas all the others were "acheless".

The Last American Virgin holds a 77% rating on Rotten Tomatoes based on thirteen reviews.

References

External links
 
 
 
 
 
 Q&A with cast at 25th anniversary screening, August 2007 (video)

1982 films
1982 comedy-drama films
1980s coming-of-age comedy-drama films
1980s pregnancy films
1980s romantic comedy-drama films
1980s sex comedy films
1980s teen comedy-drama films
1980s teen romance films
American coming-of-age comedy-drama films
American remakes of Israeli films
American romantic comedy-drama films
American sex comedy films
American teen comedy-drama films
American teen romance films
Coming-of-age romance films
1980s English-language films
Films about abortion
Films about virginity
Films directed by Boaz Davidson
Films set in Los Angeles
Golan-Globus films
Lemon Popsicle
Teen sex comedy films
Teenage pregnancy in film
Teensploitation
Films produced by Menahem Golan
Films produced by Yoram Globus
Films with screenplays by Boaz Davidson
1980s American films
1980s German films